Le Fauga is a commune in the Haute-Garonne department in southwestern France.

Population

Economy
The commune once had the headquarters of Air Méditerranée.

Transport
Le Fauga station is on the railway line from Toulouse to Pau.

See also
Communes of the Haute-Garonne department

References

Communes of Haute-Garonne